Carabus exiguus wudumontanus is a bronze-coloured subspecies of ground beetle in the subfamily Carabinae that is endemic to Gansu, China.

References

exiguus wudumontanus
Beetles described in 1998
Endemic fauna of Gansu